Red Cochrane may refer to:
 Freddie 'Red' Cochrane, boxer
 Kenneth Cochrane, college football coach